is a railway station in Obihiro, Hokkaidō, Japan.

Lines
Hokkaido Railway Company
Nemuro Main Line Station K30

Adjacent stations

Railway stations in Hokkaido Prefecture
Railway stations in Japan opened in 1986